Hockey (known as field hockey in Canada) is one of the sports at the quadrennial Commonwealth Games competition. It has been a Commonwealth Games sport since 1998. Hockey is a core sport and must be included in the sporting program of each edition of the Games.

Venues
1998 – Malaysia National Hockey Stadium
2002 – Belle Vue Leisure Centre
2006 – State Netball and Hockey Centre
2010 – Major Dhyan Chand National Stadium
2014 – Glasgow National Hockey Centre
2018 – Gold Coast Hockey Centre
2022 – University of Birmingham

Men's tournament

Results

Summary

* = host nation

Team appearances

Women's tournament

Results

Summary

* = host nation

Team appearances

Medal table

Total

Men

Women

References

Sports at the Commonwealth Games
 
Commonwealth Games